Erika Fox (born 3 October 1936) is a British composer and teacher. She was born in Vienna and emigrated to England as a refugee in 1939. She grew up in an Orthodox Jewish home, and studied composition at the Royal College of Music with Bernard Stevens, and later with Jeremy Dale Roberts and Harrison Birtwistle.

Fox was active in modern music circles from the 1970s, working with the Fires of London, the Nash Ensemble, Dartington and the Society for the Promotion of New Music. But her music faded from view in the mid-1990s. A revival of interest resulted in the issue of a CD recording in 2019, the first recordings of her music. Her orchestral work Osen Shomaat was recorded by the BBC Symphony Orchestra in 2020. Her musical style shows the influence of Eastern European folk music combined with ancient modal liturgical chant and Jewish Chassidic music.

She has taught as the Centre for Young Musicians in Pimlico, at the Guildhall School of Music and Drama, and as Visiting Composer and Teacher at the University of Auckland, New Zealand.

Works
Fox writes for stage and vocal as well as instrumental performance, and her compositions incorporate elements of Jewish traditional music. Selected works include:
Nine lessons from Isaiah (1970)
 Paths Where the Mourners Tread (1980), chamber ensemble
 Kaleidoscope (1983), quartet
Shir (1983) for large chamber ensemble
 On Visiting Stravinsky's Grave at San Michele (1988), piano
The Dancer, Hotoke (1991) chamber opera, text by Ruth Fainlight
The Moon of Moses (1992) for solo cello
Osen Shoomaat (1985) for 36 solo strings
The Bet (1990) puppet music drama, text by Elaine Feinstein
Malinconia Militare (2003) for chamber ensemble
Café, Warsaw 1944 (2005) for chamber ensemble

References

1936 births
Living people
20th-century classical composers
British Jews
British music educators
Women classical composers
British classical composers
Jewish classical composers
20th-century British composers
21st-century British composers
Women music educators
20th-century women composers